Henri Gerbault, Henry Gerbault, or Jean Louis Armand Henri Gerbault (24 June 1863 - 19 October 1930) was a French illustrator, water color painter, and poster artist.

He was born in Châtenay, Paris, France and was the nephew of the poet Sully Prudhomme. Henri studied at the École des Beaux-Arts in Paris to be a painter. Unsuccessful, he began submitting satirical cartoons to various newspaper and magazines. His work was published in magazines such as La Vie Parisienne, Fantasio, Le Rire, L'Art et la Mode and La Vie Moderne.

During his later years his wife was diagnosed with a chronic illness and they relocated to Roscoff, Brittany in 1919.

Henri Gerbault died on 19 October 1930, several years after his wife. They are both buried in the cemetery at Roscoff.

References

External links

 lambiek.net
 roscoff-quotidien.eu 

1863 births
1930 deaths
People from Châtenay-Malabry
École des Beaux-Arts alumni
19th-century French illustrators
20th-century French illustrators
19th-century French painters
20th-century French painters
20th-century French male artists
19th-century French dramatists and playwrights
20th-century French dramatists and playwrights
French erotic artists
French comics artists
French poster artists
French watercolourists
19th-century French male artists